Terron Ward (born February 15, 1992) is a former American football running back. He was signed by the Atlanta Falcons as an undrafted free agent in 2015. He played college football at Oregon State.

Early years
Ward attended and played high school football at De La Salle High School in Concord, California.

College career
Ward attended and played college football at Oregon State from 2011–2014. In the 2011 season, he had 211 rushing yards, one rushing touchdown, and 14 receptions for 76 receiving yards. In the 2012 season, he had 415 rushing yards, six rushing touchdowns, and 10 receptions for 79 receiving yards. In the 2013 season, he had 521 rushing yards, five rushing touchdowns, 34 receptions, 280 receiving yards, and three receiving touchdowns. In the 2014 season, he had 696 rushing yards, ten rushing touchdowns, and 29 receptions for 229 receiving yards.

Professional career

Ward signed with the Atlanta Falcons as an undrafted rookie free agent in 2015. As a rookie, he played in 13 games while recording 95 yards on 29 carries with one rushing touchdown along with nine receptions for 73 yards.

On September 22, 2016, he was released by the Falcons and was signed to the practice squad the next day. On October 25, 2016, he was promoted from the practice squad to the active roster.
The Falcons would have a successful season in 2016, which culminated in an appearance in Super Bowl LI. He finished the regular season with 31 carries for 151 rushing yards. Ward would be named an inactive for the Super Bowl, where the Falcons eventually lost to the New England Patriots by a score of 34–28 in overtime.

In 2017, Ward was the third running back on the team behind Devonta Freeman and Tevin Coleman, rushing for 129 yards in 14 games played.

Ward signed with the Arizona Hotshots of the Alliance of American Football for the 2019 season, but was waived during final roster cuts on January 30, 2019. He was signed by the Salt Lake Stallions on March 12, 2019. The league ceased operations in April 2019.

Personal life
Terron is the younger brother of NFL Free Agent safety T. J. Ward.

References

External links
 Atlanta Falcons bio
 Oregon State Beavers bio

1992 births
Living people
American football running backs
Atlanta Falcons players
Oregon State Beavers football players
Players of American football from San Francisco
Salt Lake Stallions players
De La Salle High School (Concord, California) alumni